Alibhabha is a 2008 Tamil thriller film produced by Pattiyal Sekhar, directed by Neelan K. Sekar. The film stars the former's son Kreshna along with Prakash Raj, and Janani in lead roles while Biju Menon, Azhagam Perumal, and Thilakan play supporting roles. Vidyasagar scored the music for the film while V. T. Vijayan handled the editing. The film released on 5 September 2008.

Plot
The city is being shaken by many heart-stopping crimes taking place at different places. Young women are being molested and killed with alarming frequency. Velu (Kreshna) helps his father Subramaniam (Prakash Raj) in stealing. Being seasoned thieves, they rob everything right from pins to cars. A spate of young women are murdered, and these developments rock the city. Thiagarajan (Azhagam Perumal), a tough cop, investigates the case. However, differences of opinions crop between the Police Commissioner (Biju Menon) and Thiagarajan. One day, Velu saves the commissioner from a meeting in order to steal the commissioner car's audio player, and gets acquainted with him. Velu then begins to fall for Janani (Janani), who works in a bank. One day, when Velu withdraws money, he is shocked to find the balance amount to be Rs. 5 Lakhs. It suddenly swells to Rs. 30 Lakhs and reaches Rs. 70 Lakhs. That is when Subramaniam realizes that this is no mere coincidence. Someone was smartly using them as a pawn to cover up for other more serious activities. They were being used as the 'third man', a pretty common term in criminal parlance. Before they realize, all of them are caught in the web that was laid out. Who laid it out, how and why and do they eventually come out of it forms Alibaba. Subramaniam comes to Velu's rescue and manages to find the reason behind it. When the family begins to find out the reason behind this act, it results in bloodshed and gore, eventually ending up in Velu coming across the killers of young women in the city.

Cast
 Kreshna as Velu
 Prakash Raj as Subramaniam, Velu's father
 Janani as Janani
 Biju Menon as Police Commissioner
 Azhagam Perumal as Thiagarajan, Asst. Police Commissioner
 Thilakan as Biju Menon's father-in-law
 Radha Ravi as Minister of Labour Department, Thilakan's friend
 Lollu Sabha Jeeva as Velu's friend
 Manobala as Loan Officer

Soundtrack

The music and background score  is composed by Vidyasagar, with lyrics written by P. Vijay, Yugabharathi and Jayantha.
"Krishna Krishna" - Ranjith
"Are Sambo Sambo" - Jassie Gift
"Neenda Mounam" - Karthik, Rajeswari
"Nenjil Aathadi" - Vidyasagar, Shiva
"Pudhiya Paarvai Ondru" - Ranjith, Sujatha Mohan

Critical reception
Sify wrote "On the whole Neelan definitely has the stuff in him, for a first timer his screenplay and narration is impressive, but towards the end goes overboard." Behindwoods wrote "Overall, Alibaba is a movie that relies on the suspense element to carry it through and the director has understood this very well, he is on the button."

References

2008 films
Indian thriller films
2000s Tamil-language films
Films scored by Vidyasagar
2008 thriller films